The Khadem (Rajasthani: ख़ादिम) are a Muslim community found in the state of Rajasthan in India, and in Pakistan. The Descendants of Lakha Bheel son of King Prithviraj III of Ajmer

History and origin 
The name "Khadem" comes from the Arabic khadem for service or care. The Khadem of Ajmer are converted Muslims from the Bhil.

"In the case the court hold as under "that Laikha and his brohther Taikha became muslim in samvat 1175 (samvat chandra bhat), It was samvat (vikrami) 1265 then Khadem are the descended of Laikha and Taikha, were bhil. Laikha's islamic name was Fakharuddin , Taikha's name was Mohammad Yadgaar... Khadem of Ajmer Are Converted Muslim From the Bheel Religion.

History of Lakhan Kotri 
Lakhan Kotri is a big locality in Rajasthan. Before the arrival of Hazrat Khwaja Moinuddin Chishty in Ajmer, the local King Prithvi Raj Chouhan had a very beautiful woman here. This woman belonged to Bhil caste. Prithvi Raj Chouhan had twenty-one sons through this woman, which is supported by the statement adduced by Farzand Ali, who was son of Wazeer Ali Khadim Khwaja Saheb on 15th February 1929 min the Court of First-Class Magistrate Ajmer, Jenab Mangilal Dosi and the same is also certified by the national history of Magare-Merwara. Out of them, four sons had died, among the remaining fifteen sons, Lakha Bhil, the son of this very Bhil woman used to reside in this locality along with his other brothers, Teka Bhil, Shakka Bhil, Bheekas Bhil, Jodha Bhil and Bardha Bhil at the time of Prithvi Raj rule, at the time of arrival of Khwaja saheb in Ajmer. By the name of this Lakha Bhil, this locality was called Lakhan Kotri and even today the same is called as such and is popular by the same. This statement is supported by the same name. This statement is supported by Col. James Tode’s historical book Tode of Rajasthan also and page no. 43 of the book” Moin-Ul-Arwah” and page no. 71 and 72 of the books “Ahsanul Sair” also support this statement. The same is proved by page no. 71 of the book by name History of Khwaja Ajmeri. More ever, in the very same locality there was silver mine, but when silver stopped to emerge, the same was closed due to the same not being profit rendering. At the time of arrival of British and in the last period of Mughals also this locality was a solitude Jungle but at the ending of the year 1817, when this city came under the capture of Britishers, the well to do persons got constructed houses after obtaining permission from British officials, which assumed the shapes of Kothies later on. The grave (Tomb) of the very same Lakha Bhil is existing in the locality Salawtan Upar wali Hathai Lane, Lakhan Kotri even now. This statement is supported by page no. 410 of book Kitab Moinul Arwah written by Nawab Khadim Hussain also and pages number 71 & 72 of the book “Ahsanul Sair” also prove that these so called khadims have continued to go there till the year 1947 AD. And continued to celebrate the Annual Urs of Lakha Bhil. Today Haji Iftekhar Ali son of Sarfraz alone is a Khadim, who pays visit to the tomb of his fore father, Lakha Bhil, regularly and resorts to phool, agarbatti etc But when these Khadims notices that there is none to know about their reality, they took advantage of this and started telling that tombs of both the wives of Khwaja in the Tosha Khana of the tomb of Khwaja Saheb and the tomb of others, is the tomb of the so called Fakhruddin Gardezi and here also they have started extracting amount from the innocent people. After gathering the historical informations of Lakahn Kotri in whose name the locality was inherited and the same is still as such, i.e. on a Bhil by name Lakha they were liventy one brother who were the so-called children of Prithvi Raj Chouhan, out of these brothers, Lakha, Tekka, Shakha, Bheeka, Jodha and Birdha approached Khwaja Saheb and in this manner, they started to visit Khwaja Saheb regularly. At the time when Khwaja Saheb was spreading Islam, Lakha Bhil, Teeka Bhil embraced Islam and accepted Khwaja Saheb as their Murshad (Religious Master) and this incident is of the year 1178 (Chander Bhai) and in the meanwhile there was Bikram Year 1265. Thus, after Lakha Bhil and Teka Bhil embraced Islam, the Islmic names were again given to them by Khwaja Saheb, i.e.the name of Lakha was kept as Fakharuddin and the name of Teka as Moahmmed Yadgar. Thus, Lakha Bhil, on account of being the child of Mohammed Yadgar is Sheikhzada Khadim. In this way, those who are associated with Anjuman Moinia Fakhriya Chishtia Syed Zadgan Khuddam Khwaja Saheb, are from the off springs of Lakha Bhil and those who are associated with Anjuman Yadgar Chishtia Sheikh Zadgan Khuddam. Khwaja Saheb are the off springs of Teka Bhil.

The above statement is supported by page number 44 and 45 of the book Chander Bhat (Called Bhai) also, which is entered in a court record file as Exhibit D-44 and 45 in a criminal case of Lakha Bhil and in connection with the support of the very same above subject, there had run a criminal case which was decreed in the year 1930 A.D. Through this very judgement it was proved that all the Khadims of the Dargah of Ajmer are from the off springs of Lakha Bhil. This case was entered in this manner that. “In the Court of Treasury officer and Magistrate First Class Ajmer Criminal Case no. 70 of 1928” Sarfraz Ali son of Yousuf Ali Khadim of Ajmer complaint versus Mohiuddin Alais Pyare Miyan Musalman of Ajmer accused decided on 31.7.1930 by Jawahar Lal Rawat Magistrate First Class.
 
In this case the Court hold as under that Lakha and his brother Tekka became Mohammedan in Samvat 1175 (Samvat Chander Bhat) it was samvat (Bikrami) 1265. Then Khadims are the descendants of Lakha and Tekka. Lakha and Tekka were Bhil. Lakha’s Islamic name was Fakharuddin, Takkas’s name was Mohammed Yadgar. 

 

Prior to the commencement of this case also the so called Khadim of Dargah got associated themselves to any one of their likings, but Muhiddin Alia, Pyare Miyan has spoken about them that: -
 
Chao Musalman Gasht Awural Eteqad Naam lakha Bhil Fakharuddin Ninhad
 
And thus, there started litigation among the so called Khadims of Dargah and Payre Miyan. Both the parties adduced their respective proofs and took the support of historical book and in this way, at least Moniuddin Alias Pyare Miyan made believe the court that the entire Khadim Community (Syed Zadgan) are the descendants of Lakah Bhil. This case is supported by page 145 and page 146 and page 147 of the book “The Shrine and Cult of Moinduudin Chishti of Ajmer” written by P.M. Curry. This book has been published in (19) countries at a time through Oxford Press London. In the support of the very same Lakha Bhil and Teka Bhil, on in enquiring from Late Haji Iftkhar Ali, the then Sadar Anjuman Lakha Walan and Late Sheikh Riyaz Mohammed the then Sadar Anjuman Tekawalkan, it was informed by Late Sheikh Riyaz Mohammed and the members of his association that on 9th August 1971 A.D. The Rajasthan High Court in its judgment has given of equal share to both these Associations from the property of Lakha Bhil and Teka Bhil. But under an agreement by playing fraud upon us it was declared that the share of Anjuman Lakha Walan and Anjuman Teka Walan is eleven Anna. I this agreement, after the name of their associated (Anjuman) Lakha Walan has not been written, on the other hand they have got written Teka walan after the name of our Association fraudulently. Hence the above statements of Sheikh Riyaz Mohammed is making certification of Lakha and Tekka even today. However, there had been several cases in connection with being the descendants of Lakha Bhil from time to time. Among these, a case no. 314 of 1928 Sharif Hussain versus Dargah Committee Ajmer also is filed. In this case the documents where are produced as Exhibit P-12, are as under: -
 
Case No. 314 of 1928. Exhibit P.12, Shareef Hussain Versus Dargah Committee Ajmer.

References

Chishti Order
Muhajir communities
Muslim communities of India
Muslim communities of Rajasthan
Social groups of Pakistan
Social groups of Rajasthan
Shaikh clans